Joey Boy is a 1965 British comedy war film directed by Frank Launder and starring Harry H. Corbett, Stanley Baxter, Bill Fraser, Percy Herbert, Lance Percival, Reg Varney and Thorley Walters. The film was based on the 1959 novel by Eddie Chapman.

Synopsis
After a gang of London Spivs are arrested for running an illegal gambling den during the Second World War they are offered a choice between prison and a tour of duty with the British Army putting their unique talents to work.

Cast
 Harry H. Corbett as Joey Boy Thompson
 Stanley Baxter as Benny 'The Kid' Lindowski
 Bill Fraser as Sergeant Major Dobbs
 Percy Herbert as Mad George Long
 Lance Percival as Clarence Doubleday
 Reg Varney as Rabbit Malone
 Moira Lister as Lady Thameridge
 Derek Nimmo as Lieutenant Hope
 Thorley Walters as Colonel Grant
 John Arnatt as Brigadier Charles Chapman
 Eric Pohlmann as Antonio
 John Phillips as Inspector Morgan
 Lloyd Lamble as Sir John Averycorn
 Edward Chapman as Tom Hobson
 Basil Dignam as General
 Vicki Woolf as Gina

Production
British Lion had been owned by the government. In 1964 the Conservative government had it denationalised. Among the films made by British Lion in its first year of independence were Joey Boy, Rotten to the Core, Dr Who and the Daleks and Dr Terror's House of Horrors. By November 1965 British Lion were seeking re-nationalisation.

Critical reception
The Guardian called it a "hopelessly ramshackle vehicle" for Harry Corbett.

Britmovie wrote, "despite pretensions to follow in the same vein as the Boulting Brothers Private's Progress there’s a distinct lack of humour here, the combined talents of TV comics Harry H. Corbett, Reg Varney and Stanley Baxter are sadly wasted in this fitful film."

References

External links

1965 films
1960s war comedy films
British war comedy films
British World War II films
Films set in London
Italian Campaign of World War II films
1965 comedy films
1960s English-language films
1960s British films